Fred Kämmerer (born 10 January 1934) is a German wrestler. He competed at the 1956 Summer Olympics and the 1960 Summer Olympics.

References

External links
 

1934 births
Living people
German male sport wrestlers
Olympic wrestlers of the United Team of Germany
Wrestlers at the 1956 Summer Olympics
Wrestlers at the 1960 Summer Olympics
Sportspeople from Saxony-Anhalt